Kolemeh is a village in Kelardasht-e Sharqi Rural District, Kelardasht District, Chalus County, Mazandaran Province, Iran. At the 2006 census, its population was 406, in 114 families.

References 

Populated places in Chalus County